Chittagong Cantonment Public College (CCPC) is a higher secondary educational institution in Chittagong, Bangladesh. It was established in 1961, and administered by the Bangladesh Army. The institution also offers post-secondary education.  It has been consecutively awarded the "Best College" award of the Chittagong district in "Jatio Shikkha Shoptaho" by the Ministry of Education in 2016, 2017 and 2018.

Curriculum
Chittagong Cantonment Public College follows the National Curriculum English and Bengali Version by the Ministry of Education, Bangladesh.

History
President Ayub Khan laid the stone of this institution. The institution got recognition by the Comilla educational board in 1971. It was once damaged by the effect of 1971 liberation war and got reestablished on 17 March 1972.

Administration
This institution is usually led by an army principal who is usually a Colonel of the Bangladesh Army. At present the principal is Col Mujibul Haque Sikder, PBGM . The school and college sections have separate vice-principals.

List of principals
 A.B. Ashraf Uddin Ahmed (7.02.75–14.05.78)
 Golam Jilani Najre Murshid (15.05.78–15.11.99)
 L. Colonel Abdul Baten, AEC (04.01.00–29.08.02)
 Colonel Mokarram Ali Khan (29.08.02–18.10.03)
 L. Colonel Mohammed Shamsul Alam, PSC AEC (24.11.03–17.01.05)
 Colonel Sayed Mofazzel Maola (17.01.05–15.08.05)
 Colonel Shah Murtaza Ali (16.08.05–04.02.07)
 Colonel Mohamed Jahid Hossain, Phd (09.05.07–16.08.08)
 Colonel Mohammed Anisur Rahman, PSC (17.08.08–20.03.10)
 Colonel Syed Golam Jahid, PSC (20.03.10-07.08.12)
 Colonel Muhammed Asadujjaman Subhani (08.08.12–16.01.13)
 Colonel Shahriyar Ahmed Chowdhury, PSC (17.01.13–12.12.13)
 Colonel Abu Saleh Muhammed Rafiqul Islam, AEC (01.01.14–06.06.15)
 Colonel Abu Naser Muhammed Toha, AFWC, PSC (06.06.15-14.02.18)
 Colonel Md. Moniruzzaman, psc (16.02.18-30.04.21)
 Col Mujibul Haque Sikder, PBGM

Faculties and departments 
The institution has only one faculty.

Faculty of Business Studies 
 Department of Management

Professional course 
 Bachelor of Business Administration

Extra-curricular activities 
Students of this institution participate in various activities outside of their studies. They have achievements in various sectors including science fairs, different olympiads etc. The institution also runs many clubs and programs.

Students
CCPC's student population has recently ranged from 3500 to 4000, across all programs (1st grade-degree level). CCPC has enrolled nearly 2500 students in school programs, 1000 students in college programs, and around 500 students in degree programs. The total population is 45% female and 55% male students.

Notable alumni 

 Salimullah Khan, he was a student of school section of this institution
Mila Islam, folk and pop singer.
Dilara Zaman, film and television actress.
Sabnam Faria, film and drama actress.
Urmila Srabonti Kar, television actress.
Rafah Nanjeba Torsa, actress and winner of Miss World Bangladesh 2019.

References

External links

 

Schools in Chittagong
Colleges in Chittagong
Educational Institutions affiliated with Bangladesh Army
Chittagong Cantonment Public College
1961 establishments in East Pakistan